Sal Maxwell Stewart (born December 7, 2003) is an American professional baseball third baseman in the Cincinnati Reds organization.

Amateur career
Stewart attended Westminster Christian School in Palmetto Bay, Florida where he played baseball. As a senior in 2022, he batted .514 with nine home runs, 23 RBIs, and 13 doubles. He ended his high school career playing 91 games while recording a .488 batting average, thirty home runs, 95 RBIs, and 31 doubles. After his senior year, he was named to the 2022 All-USA Today HSSA Baseball Team. He committed to play college baseball at Vanderbilt University.

Professional career
Stewart was selected by the Cincinnati Reds with the 32nd overall selection of the 2022 Major League Baseball draft. He signed with the team for $2.1 million.

Stewart made his professional debut with the Arizona Complex League Reds with whom he batted .295 over eight games.

References

External links

2003 births
Living people
Baseball players from Florida
Baseball third basemen
Arizona Complex League Reds players